Brendan Lane may refer to:

Brendan Lane (basketball) (born 1990), American basketball player
Brendan Lane (Gaelic footballer), Irish Gaelic football player